

Aircraft on display

Numerous T-33s have been preserved as museum and commemorative displays including:

Albania
On display
 RT-33A 51-4413 of the USAF was forced to land in December 1957 at Rinas Airport (Albania) by a squadron of 2 Albanian MiG-15bis - on display at Gjirokastra Museum

Belgium
On display
T-33 FT-25 (ex-USAF 53-5724) in Wetteren.
T-33 FT-34 (ex-USAF 55-3043/TR-043) of the Belgian Air Force at the Royal Museum of the Armed Forces and Military History in Brussels

Brazil
On display
 Unknown T-33 - Brazilian Museu Aeroespacial - Musal in Rio de Janeiro.
 Unknown T-33 - Assis Airport in Assis.
Unknown T-33 - Brazilian Air Force Base in Fortaleza.

Burma
On display
 Unknown T-33 - Armed Forces Museum in Yangon .

Canada
Most examples in Canada are Canadair CT-133 Silver Stars

On display
 T-33A 53-5413 of the United States Air Force at Happy Valley, Goose Bay

China
On display
 A former Republic of China (Taiwan) Air Force Lockheed T-33A #3024 on static display (partially wrecked) at the Military Museum of the Chinese People's Revolution in Beijing. This aircraft fell into Chinese hands when a lieutenant of the ROC Air Force defected to mainland China by flying the aircraft there during the Cold War.

Denmark

On display
 T-33A RDAF DT-102 at Danmarks Flymuseum, Stauning
 T-33A RDAF DT-289 at Garnisonsmuseet, Aalborg
 T-33A RDAF DT-491 at Danmarks Tekniske Museum, Helsingør
 T-33A RDAF DT-497 a Gate Guard at RDAF Flying School
 T-33A RDAF DT-905 at Gedhus museum

Stored or under restoration
 T-33A RDAF DT-104 in storage at Aalborg Air Force Base
 T-33A RDAF DT-884 under restoration at Skrydstrup Air Force Base
 T-33A RDAF DT-923 in storage at Danmarks Tekniske Museum, Helsingør

Greece
On display
 T-33A TR-516 in the Hellenic Air Force Museum
 T-33A TR-029 in the Hellenic Air Force Museum
 T-33A TR-516 in Elatia Lokridos, near Lamia 
 T-33 TR-876 near Akrotiri, Crete

Germany
On display
 Unknown Luftwaffe T-33 at Deutsches Museum Flugwerft Schleißheim near Munich.

Indonesia

On display

T-33A TS-3326 at Iswahyudi Air Force Base, Magetan, East Java
T-33A TS-3333 at Abdul Rachman Saleh Air Force Base, Malang, East Java
T-33A TS-3334 at Dirgantara Mandala Museum, Sleman Regency, Special Region of Yogyakarta

Italy
On display

 T-33A 9-35, 35594 at Museo storico dell'Aeronautica Militare, Vigna di Valle

Japan
On display

T-33A 61-5221 of the JASDF Air Development and Test Command at the Kakamigahara Aerospace Science Museum, Kakamigahara, Gifu.
T-33A 71-5293 of the JASDF 8th Air Wing at the Amagi Railway Amagi Line Tachiarai Station, Chikuzen, Fukuoka
T-33A 51-5639 of the JASDF at Kawaguchiko Motor Museum, Minamitsuru District, Yamanashi prefecture
T-33A 81-5386 of the JASDF at Bihoro Aviation Park in Hokkaido

Mexico
 Various T-33s are on static display at the Mexican Air Force Museum, Mexican Army and Air Force Museum and individual air bases.

Netherlands
T-33A 51-4384 / M-50 is in storage at the Nationaal Militair Museum, Soesterberg.
T-33A 51-9028 / M-5 is in storage at the Nationaal Militair Museum, Soesterberg.

Norway
On display
T-33A 117546 of the Royal Norwegian Air Force at the Norwegian Armed Forces Aircraft Collection, Oslo Airport, Gardermoen near Oslo
T-33A DT-571 of the Royal Danish Air Force painted as 16571 of the Royal Norwegian Air Force at Flyhistorisk Museum, Sola, Stavanger Airport, Sola, near Stavanger

Pakistan
 On Display
T-33A (53-5259) at the PAF Museum in Karachi.

RT-33 (53-5090) at the Army Museum Lahore

T-33 (56-1601) at PAF Base Masroor.

T-33A at the Islamabad AHQ.

Peru
On display
 T-33A at Las Palmas Air Base, Lima.

Philippines
On display
T-33 at the Philippine Air Force Museum at Villamor Air Base
T-33 at the Clark Air Base Pampanga Province.
T-33 at the Basa Air Base in Pampanga Province.
T-33 at Camp Aquino Museum in Tarlac Province.

Saudi Arabia
T-33A on display at the Royal Saudi Air Force Museum, Riyadh.

Serbia
On display
 T-33A Yugoslav 10024 (ex-USAF 52-9958, c/n 580-8189)  at the Yugoslav Aeronautical Museum, Nikola Tesla Airport, Belgrade.
Stored or under restoration
 TV-2 Yugoslav 10242 (ex-USAF 51-4034, ex-USN 126592, c/n 580-5328)  at the Yugoslav Aeronautical Museum in Belgrade.

Singapore

On display
A T-33A is on static display at the Republic of Singapore Air Force (RSAF) Museum.

South Korea

On display
A T-33A on static display at the War Memorial of Korea in Seoul.

Spain
On display
T-33, at the Airport of Santander.

Taiwan
On display
T-33, 57-0532 of the Republic of China Air Force at Chung Cheng Aviation Museum.

Thailand

On display
T-33A F11-23/13 of the Royal Thai Air Force at the Royal Thai Air Force Museum, Don Muang AFB.
T-33A F11-27/13 of the Royal  Thai Air Force at Chitladda Palace.

Turkey
T-33A
55-4952 - İnciraltı, İzmir.
51-17519 - Çiğli Air Base.
52-9919 - Anadolu University.
RT-33A
1543/8-543 - Istanbul Aviation Museum.

United Kingdom
On display
T-33A 14286 of the French Air Force on display in USAF markings at the American Air Museum, Duxford.
T-33A 14419 of the French Air Force on display in USAF markings at the Midland Air Museum, Coventry.
T-33A 17473 of the French Air Force on display in Royal Canadian Air Force markings at the Midland Air Museum, Coventry.
T-33A 54439 of the French Air Force at the North East Aircraft Museum, Sunderland.
T-33A 16718 of the French Air Force on display in USAF markings at City of Norwich Aviation Museum, Norwich
T-33A 19252 of the French Air Force under restoration Bentwaters Cold War Museum, Suffolk.
T-33A 5547 of the United States Air Force in USAF markings at the Newark Air Museum, Nottinghamshire.

United States

Airworthy
T-33A
50-0370 - privately owned in Riverside, California.
51-17445 - privately owned in Grove, Oklahoma.
51-17463 - privately owned in Concord, North Carolina.
51-6581 - Commemorative Air Force-Delta Squadron, General Dewitt Spain Airport, Memphis, Tennessee.
51-6953 - Collings Foundation in Stow, Massachusetts.
51-8734 - privately owned in Spring Grove, Illinois.
51-9127 - Warbird Heritage Foundation in Waukegan, Illinois.
56-1749 - privately owned in Leander, Texas.
56-1573 - privately owned in Big Spring, Texas.
56-3667 - privately owned in Midlothian, Texas.
56-3689 - privately owned in Grove, Oklahoma.
57-0565 - privately owned in Flathead County, Montana.
57-0609 - privately owned in Nickerson, Kansas.
58-0471 - privately owned in Midlothian, Texas.
58-0665 - privately owned in Leesville, South Carolina.
Display
T-33A
51-4025 - Spring Lake Park in Texarkana, Texas
51-4067 - American Legion Post 285 in Breckenridge, Michigan.
51-4157 - Constitution Park in Cumberland, Maryland.
51-4300 - Dyess Air Force Base, Abilene, Texas. Dyess AFB Linear Air Park. Built by the Lockheed Corporation as a T-33A and originally assigned to Big Spring, Texas (AFB) from March, 1952 to February, 1953. It was transferred in 1954 to the 3560th Pilot Training Wing at Webb AFB, Texas where it operated until retired in September 1961. The pylons under the wings were used for ECM gear, chaff dispensers, and test equipment. 7th BW Historian, Dyess AFB.  
51-4301 - Vance Air Force Base, Enid, Oklahoma.
51-4335 - Camp Edwards near Otis Air Force Base in Cape Cod, Massachusetts.
51-4505 - Tri-County Airport west of Ahoskie, North Carolina.
51-6495 - Texas Air Museum in Slaton, Texas
51-6612 - Masonic Lodge in Willacoochee, Georgia, on U.S. Route 82.
51-6635 - American Legion Post 120, Waynesboro, Georgia.
51-8627 - EAA Airventure Museum, Wittman Regional Airport, Oshkosh, Wisconsin.
51-8880 - Beatrice Municipal Airport, Beatrice, Nebraska.
51-9091 - School for Exceptional Children in Houma, Louisiana.
51-9235 - Buffalo Municipal Airport, Buffalo, Minnesota.
51-9263 - City Hall of Brooklyn, Ohio.
51-9271 - Hill Aerospace Museum, Hill AFB, Utah
52-9171 - American Legion Post 87 at the Alexandria Municipal Airport in Alexandria, Minnesota.
52-9202 - Lubbock State School, Lubbock, Texas.
52-9205 - Franklin, Nebraska
52-9223 - Ellington Field Joint Reserve Base, Houston Texas.
52-9239 - Torrance Airport in Torrance, California.
52-9497 - Air Mobility Command Museum, Dover Air Force Base, Delaware.
52-9650 - American Legion Post No. 93 in Pocomoke, Maryland.
52-9651 - Fairview Park in Centralia, Illinois.
52-9785 - Harrison County Airport, Cadiz, Ohio.
52-9797 - Fort Wayne Air National Guard Station, Fort Wayne, Indiana.  Formerly at Octave Chanute Aerospace Museum, Rantoul, Illinois.
52-9842 - Hector Municipal Airport, Hector, Minnesota.
52-9846 - Air Force Flight Test Museum beside the United States Air Force Test Pilot School, Edwards Air Force Base, California.
53-4932 - Wood County Regional Airport, Bowling Green, Ohio.
53-4938 - Lake Jackson Park, Florala, Alabama. Donated by Eglin AFB.
53-5078 - Veterans Memorial in Young's Park, Dickinson, North Dakota.
53-5109 - Tuscaloosa Regional Airport in Tuscaloosa, Alabama.
53-5158 - Albert Lea Municipal Airport, Albert Lea, Minnesota.
53-5205 - Aerospace Museum of California, McClellan Park (former McClellan AFB) Sacramento, California. 
53-5215 - Fort Worth Aviation Museum, Fort Worth, Texas.
53-5226 - National Air and Space Museum's Steven F. Udvar-Hazy Center in Chantilly, Virginia.
53-5421 - modified as a play structure at Oak Meadow Park Los Gatos, California.
53-5905 - VFW post 328 in Stoughton; the tail number is erroneously marked "3-0905" 
53-5916 - Veteran's Memorial Stadium in Cedar Rapids, Iowa. 
53-5943 - Evergreen Aviation and Space Museum, McMinnville, Oregon.
53-5947 - Air Force Armament Museum, Eglin Air Force Base, Florida.
53-5974 - National Museum of the United States Air Force at Wright-Patterson Air Force Base, Ohio.
53-5979 - Prairie Aviation Museum in Bloomington, Illinois.
53-5990 - Maurice Roberts Park in Richmond, Missouri.
53-6008 - American Legion Post 27, Apache Junction, Arizona.
53-6009 - Johnson City Radio Controllers airfield in Johnson City, Tennessee.
53-6011 - Tulsa Technology Center (Riverside Campus) Richard Loyd Jones/Riverside Airport; Tulsa, Oklahoma.  Formerly operated By NASA Johnson Space Center Houston.  Possibly flown by NASA astronauts from 1960-1967.
53-6021 - Heritage Park, Joint Base Elmendorf-Richardson, Alaska.
53-6026 - American Legion 80, near the New Richmond Regional Airport, New Richmond, Wisconsin.
53-6038 - Franklin Institute, Philadelphia, Pennsylvania; painted as 0-36038.
53-6053 - Tiger Stadium, Louisiana State University Campus, Baton Rouge, Louisiana.  
53-6073 - Kindley Park in Gravette, Arkansas.
53-6091 - Tomorrows Aeronautical Museum in Compton, California.
53-6102 - VFW Post 8562, Maverick County Lake in Eagle Pass, Texas.
55-3025 - Minnesota Air National Guard Museum located on the north side of the Minneapolis–Saint Paul International Airport, Minneapolis, Minnesota.
56-1710 - Wings Over the Rockies Air and Space Museum, Denver, Colorado.
56-1747 - American Airpower Museum, Farmingdale, New York.
56-1779 - American Legion Post 71 in Duluth, Minnesota.  Displayed as 52-9406.
57-0590 - South Dakota Air and Space Museum, Ellsworth AFB, South Dakota.
57-0688 - Aviation Cadet Museum, Eureka Springs, Arkansas.
57-6560 - Costilla County Veterans Park, Fort Garland, Colorado.
58-0509 - Jackson County Airport (Michigan).
58-0513 - March Field Air Museum in Riverside, California.
58-0542 - JROTC Gen C Powell Hall, Central High School, Highway 67 San Angelo, Texas.
58-0548 - Strategic Air & Space Museum, Ashland, Nebraska
58-0629 - Castle Air Museum at the former Castle Air Force Base in Atwater, California.
58-0651 - Southwest Technical Institute, East Camden, Arkansas.
58-0669 - Air Force Flight Test Museum beside the United States Air Force Test Pilot School, Edwards Air Force Base, California.
58-2106 - McChord Air Museum, McChord Air Force Base, Washington.;
T-33B
58-0480 - National Naval Aviation Museum, Pensacola Naval Air Station, Florida.
Sampson Air force museum, former Sampson Air Force base, Romulus, NY T-33 on display 
580-1102 - On display at "Park Township Airport" in Holland, Michigan. The airport is now out of service, but the aircraft remains.

Uruguay
On display
Uruguayan Air Force Airbase #2 (St. Bernardina, Durazno)
 Airbase #1 (Carrasco Intl. Airport)
 ETA (Technical Air School)
 Cnel. (Av.) Jaime Meregalli.Museo Aeronáutico (Air Museum)

References

Lockheed T-33 Shooting Star